Hot Rats is the second solo album by Frank Zappa, released in October 1969. It was Zappa's first recording project after the dissolution of the original version of the Mothers of Invention. Five of the six songs are instrumental; while "Willie the Pimp", features vocals by Captain Beefheart.  In his original sleeve notes, Zappa described the album as "a movie for your ears".

Zappa dedicated the album to his newborn son, Dweezil. In February 2009, Dweezil's tribute band to his father, Zappa Plays Zappa, won a Grammy for Best Rock Instrumental Performance for their rendition of "Peaches en Regalia".

Background
Because Hot Rats largely consists of instrumental jazz-influenced compositions with extensive soloing, the music sounds very different from earlier Zappa albums, which featured satirical vocal performances with extensive use of musique concrète and editing.  Multi-instrumentalist Ian Underwood is the only member of the Mothers to appear on the album and was the primary musical collaborator.  Other featured musicians were bassists Max Bennett and Shuggie Otis (who was only 15 years old at the time of the session); drummers John Guerin, Paul Humphrey and Ron Selico; and electric violinists Don "Sugarcane" Harris and Jean-Luc Ponty.

This was the first Frank Zappa album recorded on 16-track equipment and one of the first albums to use this technology.  Machines with 16 individual tracks allow for much more flexibility in multi-tracking and overdubbing than the professional 4 and 8-track reel-to-reel tape recorders that were standard in 1969.

In the Q & Mojo Classic Special Edition Pink Floyd & The Story of Prog Rock, the album was number 13 in its list of "40 Cosmic Rock Albums". It was also included in the book 1001 Albums You Must Hear Before You Die. In 2000 it was voted number 123 in Colin Larkin's All Time Top 1000 Albums.

Music

Zappa composed, arranged and produced the album himself. His primary instrument on the album is lead guitar. "Willie the Pimp", "Son of Mr. Green Genes", and "The Gumbo Variations" are showcases for his powerful and unconventional solo guitar performances.  Four of the tracks have intricately arranged charts featuring multiple overdubs by Ian Underwood.  Underwood plays the parts of approximately eight to ten musicians, often simultaneously.  His work includes complicated sections of piano and organ, as well as multiple flutes, clarinets and saxophones.

The song "Peaches en Regalia" is widely recognized as a modern jazz fusion standard and is one of Zappa's best-known songs. Zappa plays a short solo on an instrument credited as an "octave-bass". Underwood contributes flute and multiple saxophone, clarinet and keyboard parts. Zappa later re-recorded the song several times in live performances. It has been re-interpreted by many other jazz and rock artists, including Phish, the Dixie Dregs, Frogg Café and Kerrie Biddell.

"Willie the Pimp" is a blues-influenced rock tune which features a vocal by Zappa's longtime friend and collaborator Captain Beefheart. It has violin by Don "Sugarcane" Harris and guitar solos by Zappa in what appear to be loose jams, though the performances were edited before release. The album's title comes from the lyrics of this song.

"Son of Mr. Green Genes" is an instrumental re-arrangement of the song "Mr. Green Genes" from the Mothers' album Uncle Meat. The unusual title of this song led to an urban legend that Zappa was related to the actor who played Mr. Green Jeans on the television show Captain Kangaroo. This is the only song on the album to feature both intricate horn charts and extended guitar solo sections.

"Little Umbrellas" is similar in style to "Peaches", another short, carefully arranged tune with numerous keyboard and wind overdubs by Underwood.

"The Gumbo Variations" also is a jam performance that features a tenor saxophone from Underwood and intricate electric violin by Don "Sugarcane" Harris as well as a guitar solo by Zappa. The 1987 CD issue contains a longer version of this track.

"It Must Be a Camel" is also has numerous overdubs by Underwood. The very unusual melody of this song is due to its repeated use of quintuplets (a staple of later Zappa compositions) and often makes large melodic leaps.  The title may come from the fact that parts of the melodic line resemble the shape of camel "humps" when written down. Jean-Luc Ponty plays violin.

A recording from the Hot Rats sessions titled "Bognor Regis" was set to be released on the B-side of an edited version of "Sharleena", a track from the 1970 Zappa album Chunga's Revenge. The single release was canceled; however, an acetate disc copy was leaked to the public and the track has appeared on Zappa bootlegs. The song was named after a town in England and is a blues instrumental with an electric violin solo by Don "Sugarcane" Harris. Another track recorded during these sessions, titled "Twenty Small Cigars", was later released on Chunga's Revenge. Other bits from the Hot Rats sessions appeared on the 1970 albums Burnt Weeny Sandwich and Weasels Ripped My Flesh.

Advanced recording techniques
Zappa used advanced recording equipment to create an album of outstanding technical and musical quality. The album was recorded on what Zappa described as a "homemade sixteen track" recorder; the machine was custom built by engineers at TTG Studios in Hollywood in late 1968. Additional tracks made it possible for Zappa to add multiple horn and keyboard overdubs. Only a few musicians were required to create an especially rich instrumental texture which gives the sound of a large group. It was this use of advanced overdubbing that was the main motivation for Zappa, who hated playing in a studio.

Artwork
The colorful, psychedelic aura of the late sixties is apparent in the graphic design and photography of Hot Rats, though Zappa himself disdained the psychedelic movement. At a time when gatefold covers were usually reserved for double-disc albums, this one-disc album had a gatefold featuring the elaborate artwork of Cal Schenkel. The front and back cover photos by Andee Nathanson use infrared photography and reflects Zappa's taste for striking visual images, combined with the absurdly humorous. The woman pictured on the cover is  Christine Frka, alias Miss Christine of The GTOs.  For years these cover photos were incorrectly credited to Ed Caraeff.

Release history
The LP was released on the blue Bizarre label in the United States in 1969. The inside of the original gatefold LP cover has a collage of color pictures, many of which were taken during the recording sessions. In 1973 the album was re-issued by Reprise Records. This version was deleted in 1981 when Zappa's contract with record distributor Warner Bros. Records ended.

In 1987 Zappa remixed Hot Rats for re-issue on CD by Rykodisc. On this edition many of the photos were removed, and the few that were included were printed in black and white. "Willie the Pimp" is edited differently during the introduction and guitar solo. "The Gumbo Variations" is four minutes longer; it includes an introduction and guitar and saxophone solo sections which were left out of the LP version. On "Little Umbrellas", the piano and flute are more prominent than on the LP. Other differences include significant changes to the overall ambiance and dynamic range. The 1995 CD reissue restored the full gatefold artwork.

A 2008 remaster of the original mix was used for a 2009 limited edition audiophile LP by Classic Records and for the 2012 Universal Music CD reissue.
 Zappa Records reissued the album in a 180 gram LP in 2016, remastered by Bernie Grundman. On 20 December 2019, Zappa Records released The Hot Rats Sessions, a 50th anniversary 6 CD box set of music recorded during the sessions for the album which included the no longer available 1987 mix and many previously unissued takes and mixes.

The album was a top ten hit in Britain and the Netherlands in 1969–1970.

Track listing

Personnel
Credits are adapted from Hot Rats liner notes.

Frank Zappa – guitar, octave bass, percussion
Ian Underwood – piano, organus maximus, flute, all clarinets, all saxes

Also featuring
Captain Beefheart – vocals on "Willie the Pimp"
Max Bennett – bass on all tracks except "Peaches en Regalia"
Shuggie Otis – bass on "Peaches en Regalia"
John Guerin – drums on "Willie the Pimp", "Little Umbrellas" and "It Must Be a Camel"
Paul Humphrey – drums on "Son of Mr. Green Genes" and "The Gumbo Variations"
Ron Selico – drums on "Peaches en Regalia"
Don "Sugarcane" Harris – violin on "Willie the Pimp" and "The Gumbo Variations"
Jean-Luc Ponty – violin on "It Must Be a Camel"
Lowell George – rhythm guitar (uncredited)

Production
Producer: Frank Zappa
Director of engineering: Dick Kunc
Engineers: Cliff Goldstein, Jack Hunt, Brian Ingoldsby, Dick Kunc
Arranger: Frank Zappa
Cover design: Cal Schenkel
Design: Cal Schenkel, John Williams

Charts

References

External links
 Hot Rats vinyl vs. CD
 FZ chronology

1969 albums
Albums produced by Frank Zappa
Bizarre Records albums
Frank Zappa albums
Jazz fusion albums by American artists
Reprise Records albums
Rykodisc albums
Albums recorded at Sunset Sound Recorders